The Little Grand Canyon (officially named Grand Canyon)  is a box canyon located in Shawnee National Forest in Jackson County, Illinois, United States, south of Murphysboro. It is located on east bank of the Big Muddy River across from Turkey Bayou to the west, between Swallow Rock to the north and Chalk Bluff to the south. Access to the park is gained from Hickory Ridge Road to the east. The area was designated a National Natural Landmark in February 1980.

Description
Erosion carved this deep box canyon from the sandstone of the Shawnee Hills, and it opens into the floodplain of the Mississippi River near Turkey Bayou. The canyon contains several seasonal and a few permanent waterfalls, some descending through dramatic cascades of sculpted sandstone. The  trail is marked by white diamond blazes and begins in the upland hardwood forest. The trail then descends through a steep and sometimes slippery sandstone side canyon to the lusher, damper habitat of the canyon floor. The ascent from the canyon requires a small amount of climbing at the Three Sisters Waterfall. Stone steps on parts of the trail were constructed by the Civilian Conservation Corps, not by Native Americans as some believe. There is about a  difference in elevation between the bottom of the canyon and the trailhead. The trailhead facilities include a picnic area and pit toilet, and no water is available. Hikers should be aware of unmarked and unguarded cliff edges and the possibility of flash floods during heavy rain.

The area was known in the 1930s as both the Hanging Gardens of Egypt and Rattlesnake Den. These names were references to the abundance of wildflowers in the canyon and one of the best rattlesnake dens in the United States, respectively. However, excessive collection of rattlesnakes greatly reduced the populations.

There are a number of Little Grand Canyons across America, including this one in Jackson County, Illinois; another in Lumpkin, Georgia; and another in the Emery County, Utah.

References

Landforms of Jackson County, Illinois
Landforms of Illinois
Protected areas of Jackson County, Illinois
Shawnee National Forest
Hiking trails in Illinois
Canyons and gorges of the United States
National Natural Landmarks in Illinois